"Parler tout bas" (English: "speak softly") is the third single by Alizée released in April 2001. It featured an instrumental rendition of the song in addition to Alizée's solo rendering.

Music video
The video for the song features Alizée in an outdoors bedroom with toys and later, in a forest. The subject of the video seems to be the little teddy bear in her arms. Her act of burying the teddy bear (later in the video, while in the forest) could be a sign of leaving childlike innocence behind.
The actor in the video (Jérome Devoise) also appeared in the video for Moi... Lolita.
The video premiered on 25 April 2001 and was directed by Laurent Boutonnat. It premiered on M6.

Track listings
CD single Polydor
"Parler tout bas" – 4:35
"Parler tout bas" (instrumental)" – 4:35

Digital download
"Parler tout bas" – 4:35

Charts, certifications, sales

References

2001 singles
Alizée songs
Music videos directed by Laurent Boutonnat
Songs with music by Laurent Boutonnat
Songs with lyrics by Mylène Farmer
2001 songs
Universal Records singles